Loris is a city in Horry County, South Carolina, United States. The population was 2,396 at the 2010 census, up from 2,079 in 2000.

Geography
Loris is in northern Horry County on the Atlantic coastal plain. U.S. Route 701 passes through the city, leading southwest  to Conway, the Horry county seat, and north  to Tabor City, North Carolina. SC Highway 9 Business (Main Street) crosses US 701 in the center of Loris, leading northwest  to SC 9 near Green Sea, and southeast  to SC 9 near Goretown.

Demographics

2020 census

As of the 2020 United States census, there were 2,449 people, 1,152 households, and 656 families residing in the city.

2010 census
As of the census of 2010, there were 2,396 people, 819 households, and 546 families residing in the city which indicated a +15.2 growth. The population density was 668.2 people per square mile (258.1/km2). There were 922 housing units at an average density of 296.3 per square mile (114.5/km2). The racial makeup of the city was 52.8% White, 39.4% African American, 0.08% Native American, 1.2% Asian, 0.03% from other races, and 1.5% from two or more races. Hispanic or Latino of any race were 4.4% of the population.

There were 967 households, out of which 25.4% had children under the age of 18 living with them, 42.7% were married couples living together, 21.1% had a female householder with no husband present, and 33.3% were non-families. 29.3% of all households were made up of individuals, and 12.6% had someone living alone who was 65 years of age or older. The average household size was 2.43 and the average family size was 3.01.

In the city, the population was spread out, with 22.5% under the age of 18, 9.7% from 18 to 24, 24.7% from 25 to 44, 24.4% from 45 to 64, and 18.8% who were 65 years of age or older. The median age was 40 years. For every 100 females, there were 82.4 males. For every 100 females age 18 and over, there were 74.5 males.

The median income for a household in the city was $26,250, and the median income for a family was $33,036. Males had a median income of $25,750 versus $17,180 for females. The per capita income for the city was $13,779. About 22.7% of families and 28.8% of the population were below the poverty line, including 44.7% of those under age 18 and 20.7% of those age 65 or over.

Media

Newspapers
 The Loris Times (local news)

Weekly
 Tabor-Loris Tribune (local news)

Radio

AM
WLSC/1240

Transportation

Airports
 Myrtle Beach International Airport (MYR)
 Twin City Airport (5J9) (local airport for light aircraft)

Mass transit
 The Coast RTA  - Bus system operating seven days a week, 364 days a year.  15 routes throughout the Horry County/Grand Strand area, including Myrtle Beach, North Myrtle Beach, Surfside Beach, Conway, Loris, and Aynor.

As of May 2008, Coast has not served Loris.

Education
Loris has a public library, a branch of the Horry County Memorial Library.

Arts and culture
The annual Loris Bog-off is held on the third weekend in October, in the downtown Loris area. Chicken bog is a dish of chicken, rice, sausage and spices; it originated in the Pee Dee area of South Carolina. The Loris Bog-off features carnival-type rides, concessions, regional performers, and petting zoo animals. Local schools also participate in performances and many other contests such as duck calling are held.

Notable person
 Robert H. Brooks, founder of Hooters in the mid-1980s and the Naturally Fresh Foods in Atlanta in 1966.

References

External links
 City of Loris official website
 SCIway Loris, South Carolina
 City Data Loris, South Carolina
 Loris Chamber of Commerce
  Horry County Government
  Loris Elementary School
 Daisy Elementary School
  Loris Middle School
  Loris High School
 NOAA Weather for Loris, South Carolina

 
Cities in South Carolina
Cities in Horry County, South Carolina